Het Nieuwe Volk ('The New People') was a Dutch-language newspaper published in Utrecht, Netherlands between 15 June 1940 and 4 October 1941. Het Nieuwe Volk was the organ of the National Socialist Dutch Workers Party of Ernst Herman van Rappard. It was founded as a continuation of De Nationaal-socialist. The newspaper was initially published fortnightly, but became a weekly paper on 24 August 1940. Johan Hepp was the editor of Het Nieuwe Volk.

References

1940 establishments in the Netherlands
1941 disestablishments in the Netherlands
Defunct newspapers published in the Netherlands
Dutch-language newspapers
Mass media in Utrecht (city)
Nazi newspapers
Newspapers established in 1940
Publications disestablished in 1941
Weekly newspapers published in the Netherlands